Margecany is a village and municipality in the Gelnica District in the Košice Region of eastern Slovakia. Total municipality population was, in 2011, 1964 inhabitants. Margecany is a very important railway junction situated on the main railway corridor (Košice–Bohumín Railway) connecting Košice with Žilina and Bratislava. Ružín reservoir regulates rivers Hornád and Hnilec. Technical attraction is the Bujanov tunnel.

See also
Bujanov Tunnel

References

External links
http://www.margecany.sk

Villages and municipalities in Gelnica District
Spiš